Patricia Anne Jessopp (born  October 1963 in Preston, Lancashire), known professionally as Anne Jessopp, is the Chief Executive Officer of the British Royal Mint, and former Director of Commemorative Coins for the Royal Mint.

References 

1963 births
British women chief executives
Living people
British chief executives